Krivtsovo is a rural locality (a village) in Yesiplevskoye Rural Settlement, Kolchuginsky District, Vladimir Oblast, Russia. The population was 3 as of 2010.

Geography 
Krivtsovo is located 24 km east of Kolchugino (the district's administrative centre) by road. Bashkirdovo is the nearest rural locality.

References 

Rural localities in Kolchuginsky District